The 2020 Polish Athletics Championships was the 96th edition of the national championship in outdoor track and field for athletes in Poland. It was held between 28 and 30 August at the Stadion OSiR-u in Włocławek.

The event was originally scheduled for 25–27 June but was postponed due to the COVID-19 pandemic. This was originally meant to serve as qualification for the national team at the 2020 European Athletics Championships, but that event was also cancelled.

Championships

Results

Men

Women

Mixed

References 

Results
 96. PZLA Mistrzostwa Polski. Włocławek, 28–30 sierpnia 2020 . PZLA.pl (2020-08-30). Retrieved 2021-03-19.

External links
Polish Athletics Association website 

2020
Polish Championships
Polish Athletics Championships
Sport in Kuyavian-Pomeranian Voivodeship
Włocławek
Polish Athletics Championships, 2020